The Bishop of Melbourne may refer to:

 Anglican Bishop of Melbourne, precursor title of the Anglican Archbishop of Melbourne
 Roman Catholic Bishop of Melbourne, precursor title of the Roman Catholic Archbishop of Melbourne